"No Existe" is a Latin pop song by Colombian duo  Siam. Is the second single from their second studio album Las Cosas Que Nunca Nos Dijimos. It was released on September 7, 2012 under the label Colombo Records.

Song information
In an interview with the newspaper El Tiempo, Carolina Nuñez told about the song that "Is a song very glad, a very romantic reggae with a sticky rhythm. We wanted was tell us about the things that we like us to one another and so born the song, more or less of a personal experience. The good news is that we released it a few weeks ago and reached the first place on the radio charts together Alejandro Sanz and Andrés Cepeda. And we feel very proud because are artist that we admire"

Track listing

Credits and personnel 
Recording
Recorded at New World Music, Bogotá, Colombia and mixed at Boris Milan Studios, Miami, FL.

Personnel

Songwriting – Carlos Montaño
Production – José Gaviria and Fernando Tobón
Vocal engineering and recording – José Gaviria
Music recording – Carlos Montaño, José Gaviria and Fernando Tobón

Assistant vocal recording – Siam
Mixing – Boris Milán

Credits adapted from the liner notes of Las Cosas Que Nunca Nos Dijimos, Colombo Records.

Charts

References

Siam (duo) songs
2012 singles
Spanish-language songs
2012 songs